206th Division or 206th Infantry Division may refer to:

 206th Coastal Division
 206th Division (1st Formation)(People's Republic of China), 1949–1950
 206th Division (2nd Formation)(People's Republic of China), 1969–1985
 206th Division (Imperial Japanese Army)
 206th Infantry Division (German Empire)
 206th Infantry Division (Wehrmacht)
 206th Rifle Division